Oravce is a village and municipality in Banská Bystrica District in the Banská Bystrica Region of central Slovakia.

History
In historical records the village was first mentioned in 1557.

Geography
The municipality lies at an altitude of 424 metres and covers an area of 4.722 km2. It has a population of about 178 people.

References

External links
 http://en.e-obce.sk/obec/oravce/oravce.html

Villages and municipalities in Banská Bystrica District